This Pershing missile bibliography is a list of works related to the Pershing 1 and Pershing 1a Field Artillery Missile Systems and the Pershing II Weapon System.

Books

Martin / Martin Marietta

Bendix

Burroughs

US Army

Lineage and honors
 
 
 
 
 
 
 
 
  (3rd Ordnance Battalion, 56th Field Artillery Command)
  (56th Field Artillery Command amendment)
  (Pershing Project Manager's Office)

History

Technical manuals

Soldier's manuals

Other
  Translated from:

US Air Force

German Air Force

Central Intelligence Agency

MAN

Articles

Aviation Week

Bulletin of the Atomic Scientists

Field Artillery

Artillery Trends (1958–1969)

The Field Artilleryman (1969-1973)

Field Artillery Journal (1973-1987)

Field Artillery (1987-2007)

Fires (2007)

Interavia

Life

The New York Times

The Ordnance Magazine

The Giant and The Pershing Cable

PS: The Preventive Maintenance Monthly

Redstone Rocket

Time

Other

Other

PanzerBaer

Documentaries

The Big Picture

Other
 
 
 
 
 
 
 
 
  FKGrp 12 graduation firing at Fort Bliss, Texas. AO-12 X-77.

Photos

Walkarounds

Audio

Fiction

Novels
  Nick Carter must retrieve a plaster Madonna containing the computer codes of all the Pershing missiles.
  The KGB resists Pershing II missiles being deployed in West Germany.
  The first few chapters are based on the real-life experiences of a Pershing missile guard with the 2nd Battalion, 4th Infantry Regiment.
  The codes for Pershing missiles based at Ramstein Air Base are stolen.
  In post-apocalyptic America of 2015, a would be dictator uses seven National Guard Pershing 1 missiles painted red to attack Denver.
  A Pershing missile escaped destruction during the Intermediate-Range Nuclear Forces Treaty elimination and terrorists use it to threaten London.
  During an alien invasion, Pershing missiles are retargeted to attack an orbiting ship.

Film
  There are two short scenes with a Pershing 1 at 1:17:06 and 1:18:51.
  A Pershing II missile is created from 31 January 1983 cover of Time.
  Cmdr. Hunter is watching the news when the newscaster states "Threatened to use nuclear arms on the United States and Japan... should anyone, including the Russian Army, attempt to move in on him." The missile being erected is a Pershing II.
  The character is wearing the inverted insignia of the 56th Field Artillery Command.
  The scene at the National Air and Space Museum includes prop versions of the Pershing II and SS-20 missiles.

Television
  Wonder Woman must stop the hijacking of an experimental thought controlled missile. The missile prop is an Estes model rocket  Pershing.
  The interceptor missile launch is U.S. Army footage of a Pershing 1a missile launch.
  The series is set in 1983 West Germany during the Pershing II deployment. Series opening includes a Pershing 1a being erected.
  Series opening includes a Pershing 1a being erected.

Music
  The first verse ends with "And a Pershing II rises from the Olympus Range"
  The gatefold photo has four of the band members wearing the insignia of the 56th Field Artillery Command.

Music videos
  The missile is a Pershing 1a being erected with a timestamp of 13 November 1979. The scene occurs after the line "There's armies in the cities and the missiles stand ready for flight."

Artwork
 
 
 
 
 
 
 George Finley is a military artist who was the commander of the 74th U.S. Army Field Artillery Detachment, supporting Missile Wing 1 of the German Air Force. In 1988, the Blackjack Pershing Chapter of the United States Field Artillery Association commissioned a painting to commemorate the decommissioning of the Pershing system. 501 signed prints of The Final Countdown were created. The print is now available for sale again through his website.
 
Tsereteli created a sculpture using sections of scrapped US Pershing and Soviet SS-20 nuclear missiles. The sculpture, entitled Good Defeats Evil is a 39 foot high, 40 ton monumental bronze statue of St George fighting the dragon of nuclear war. It was donated to the UN by the Soviet Union in 1990 and placed on the grounds of the UN headquarters in New York City. A series of works based on the sculpture that also incorporated scrap from the missiles were released in a limited series of 160 each.
 
 A 39-inch-tall sculpture
 An enamel plaque with a copper back
 Bronze medallion
 The INF Treaty Missile Commemorative uses missile shards with a 7½ bronze medallion

Memorabilia

World Memorial Fund for Disaster Relief
Leonard Cheshire created the World Memorial Fund for Disaster Relief in 1990. The charity obtained Pershing and SS-20 scrap material and created memorabilia for fund raising.

  The badge is the group logo, a World War I whistle.
 
Parker created the World Memorial Pens, a series of pens and mechanical pencils with a Memorial Fund badge on the crown or clip, with half the proceeds going to the fund.
 Duofold Black International Fountain Pen
 Duofold Black International Ball Pen
 Duofold Black International Fountain Pen and Ball Pen; 90192
 Sonnet Fountain Pen
 Laque Black Ball Pen; 81632
 Laque Black Ball Pen and Mechanical Pencil
 Stainless GT Ball Pen; 81732
 Stainless GT Ball Pen and Mechanical Pencil
 14K Dimonite G Ball Pen; 81532
 14K Dimonite G Ball Pen and Mechanical Pencil
 
 On 4 November 1991 the Ronald Reagan Presidential Library opened in Simi Valley, California. The then five living presidents, Richard Nixon, Gerald Ford, George H. W. Bush, Jimmy Carter and Ronald Reagan were present at the opening. Parker presented each with a black ballpoint Duofold Centennial with the Presidential Seal on the crown formed from scrap material and the barrel engraved with signatures of the presidents. The pen was also offered in a walnut box with the names of all five presidents and the Presidential Seal.

Other
 

Pershing missile
Bibliographies by subject

ps:The Preventive Maintenance Monthly